The National Library of the Republic of the Maldives (Gaumee Kuthubuhaanaa) was established in 1945. It serves as the Public and National Library of the country, maintaining modern literature. It provides a diverse collection of all published reading materials and documents within the country. The National Library is financed by the government and functions under the Ministry of Information Arts and Culture.

History in brief 
The National Library of the Republic of Maldives was founded on 12 July 1945 as the "State Library" of the Maldives by Ameer Mohamed Amin Didi, then the Head of the Department of Education. The Library was renamed "Majeedi Library" in 1948 after one of the most popular statesmen of the Maldives, Ameer Abdul Majeed Didi. 
In the climate of development and modernization that has prevailed since 1978 the library was named "National Library" by President Maumoon Abdul Gayoom on 1 June 1982.

The Library has a fairly good number of Arabic, Urdu, Dhivehi, and English books. The English section holds more than 37,970 books including both Reference Fiction and Non-Fiction. Dhivehi section, Arabic section and Urdu section holds 10212, 1570 and 950 books respectively. In addition, the Library holds special collections in its American Corner; UN collection; Women and Gender collection. Serial collection holds periodical volumes, reports, manuscripts, journals and other serials, newspapers and press cutting files, and pamphlets. 
The Library's collection includes books relating to different subjects such as: Generalities; Philosophy & Psychology; Religion; Social Sciences; Environment; Language; Natural Sciences & Mathematics; Technology (Applied Science); The Arts - Fine and Decorative arts; Literature & Rhetoric; Geography & History.

External links and references
 Official Website of the National Library
 More information

Libraries in the Maldives
Maldives
1945 establishments in the Maldives
Libraries established in 1945